Randy Hunt may refer to:

 Randy Hunt (baseball) (born 1960), Major League Baseball catcher
 Randy Hunt (American football), American football coach
 Randy Hunt (politician) (born 1957), member of the Massachusetts House of Representatives